Xintiandi Street is a metro station on Line 3 and Line 4 of the Hangzhou Metro in China. It is located in the Gongshu District of Hangzhou. The station was opened on 21 February 2022.

Station layout 
The station has two stacked-island platforms that offer a cross-platform interchange between Line 3 and Line 4 in inverse direction. Line 3 uses pair of tracks at the north (upper) side while Line 4 uses tracks at the south (lower) side. There are five exits.

References 

Railway stations in Zhejiang
Railway stations in China opened in 2022
Hangzhou Metro stations